Arden is a historic estate outside Harriman, New York, that was owned by railroad magnate Edward Henry Harriman and his wife, Mary Averell Harriman. By the early 1900s, the family owned  in the area, half of it comprising the Arden Estate.  The main house is at the top of a mountain east of the village, reachable by Arden House Road from NY 17. Since 2011, it has been owned by the nonprofit Research Center on Natural Conservation, which operates Arden House as a conference center with 97 guest rooms.

History

On September 17, 1886, Harriman bought at auction the  Peter Parrott family estate for $52,500, which was named Arden by the Parrott family after Mrs. Parrott's maiden name. Over the next several years, he purchased an additional , almost forty different parcels of land, and built  of bridle paths. Harriman hired Carrère and Hastings to design a home, which was begun in 1905.  Harriman had planned it for many years, but lived in it for only a few months before his death in 1909.

The house features a dramatic music room, modeled after a medieval great hall. Around the central courtyard is a brick corridor lined with murals by Barry Faulkner. Harriman commissioned a number of American artists to decorate the house. James Earle Fraser did a bas-relief portrait of Harriman over one of the fireplaces, as well as a fountain in the interior court; Malvina Hoffman did a bust of Mrs. Harriman; and Charles Cary Rumsey did a fountain of the Three Graces, a marble fireplace surround that featured a caricature of architect Thomas Hastings, and corbel carvings of bighorn sheep in the music room. He also managed to marry Harriman's daughter, Mary, in 1910, much to the surprise of society. Lining the staircase were Herter Brothers tapestries depicting the creation of the house. On the second floor was an "Indian Corridor", featuring photographs of Native Americans taken by Edward S. Curtis during the Harriman Alaska Expedition of 1899.

Mary Averell Harriman gave the house to her son W. Averell Harriman upon his wedding in 1915, although she continued to live in the west wing of the building until her death in 1932. After the U.S. entered World War II, the family offered the house to the U.S. Navy, which turned it into the first of the Navy's convalescent hospitals, modeled on those that England and Russia had already successfully created. In 1950, Averell Harriman and his brother Roland deeded the property to Columbia University, as "home of The American Assembly", a public policy institution founded by Dwight D. Eisenhower the same year. It became primarily used as a center for executive management programs. The house was identified as America's first conference center, and became a National Historic Landmark in 1966 but is not open to the public.

It was from this estate that Mary Averell Harriman donated  and one million dollars to New York State to start Harriman State Park in 1910.

In 2007, the Open Space Institute bought Arden House and its surrounding . The house commands extensive views of the Ramapo River Valley.

In 2010, the Open Space Institute put the house up for sale. The house was purchased in 2011 by a Chinese-backed nonprofit, the Research Center on Natural Conservation, Inc. In 2015, the same group bought the bankrupt New York Military Academy.

See also

List of largest houses in the United States
List of National Historic Landmarks in New York
National Register of Historic Places in Orange County, New York

References

Bibliography
Ossman, Laurie; Ewing, Heather (2011). Carrère and Hastings, The Masterworks. Rizzoli USA. .

External links

Arden House website
Aerial video of Arden House

Houses in Orange County, New York
Houses completed in 1909
National Historic Landmarks in New York (state)
Houses on the National Register of Historic Places in New York (state)
National Register of Historic Places in Orange County, New York
Carrère and Hastings buildings
Ramapos
Châteauesque architecture in the United States
Columbia University campus
Harriman family
Gilded Age mansions